Bundz - also known as bunc (Podhale dialect)  is Goral sheep milk cheese. It is traditionally produced in Podhale. 

The production process of bundz in the first phase looks the same as the production of oscypek. The milk poured into the "putara" is hagged, which means that the protein is truncated by enzymes contained in rennet, extracted from the stomachs of young calves. The resulting cheese curd is then brewed for a few minutes at a temperature of about 70 ° C. The cheese is strained on the canvas in the form of large lumps. A mild cheese is obtained. 

The drink żętyca is also produced from the whey created in bundz production.

See also
 Bryndza Podhalańska, a Polish variety of soft cheese made from sheep milk.
 Oscypek, a smoked hard cheese, made in Poland from salted sheep milk

References

Polish cheeses
Sheep's-milk cheeses